Len Gridley Everett (April 18, 1925 – November 25, 1984) was an American painter.

Early life
Everett born in Burlington, Iowa, April 18, 1925 to Maude Gridley Everett and Reid Everett. He grew up near Monmouth, Illinois and graduated from Kirkwood, Illinois High School.

Career
Len served in the United States Navy during World War II. He attended the State University of Iowa, Iowa City, (BFA-1950, MFA-1952). Everett taught at the University of Iowa briefly. He studied painting and drawing in New York City at the Art Students League with Robert Brackman, Joseph Hirsch, and Robert Hale; at the National Academy of Design with Robert Phillipp; and in Provincetown, Massachusetts at the Provincetown Art School with Henry Hensche. Len maintained professional art studios in Carnegie Hall and at 41 Union Square, New York City, New York. He taught privately from his studio and taught classes at the Kittredge Women's Club in New York City.

The American Heartland was the dominant subjects of his work. Known for his meticulous still life paintings, he combined smooth layer paint, subtleness of color, and his unique perspectives and composition of simple objects such as vegetables, fruits, and flowers. He served leadership positions for the Audubon Artist and the Allied Artists of America.

Death
Everett died November 25, 1984 at Burlington Medical Center, Burlington, Iowa, after suffering from oral cancer.

Len G. Everett was described as a simple person, with simple tastes, and simple ideas. According to the executor of his estate, R.A. McCannon,"he was uncomfortable with compliments and accolades, but was in awe of other associates in the New York art scene in the 70s and 80s..Every painting was his own idea, every still life component was selected personally, every composition painstakingly studied and developed…Discussion for his plans for a painting were seldom…He was secure and firm about his work…Discussion occurred only after a work was complete."

Awards
 Washington and Jefferson National Painting Show, 1972
 National Art Round-Up, 1971
 Allied Artists of America, 1969
 Audubon Artists, 1969
 Berkshire Art Association, 1967
 Silvermine Guild of Artists, 1966
 Hudson Valley Art Association, 1965–1976
 Painters and Sculptors Society of New Jersey, 1964
 Salmagundi Club, 1963, 1964, 1965, 1966
 American Veterans Society of Artists, 1961, 1972
 Washington Square, New York City, 1967–1968
 Washington and Jefferson Painting Show, 1972
 National Art Round-Up, Second Place, 1971
 Allied Artists of America, Syndicated Magazine Medal of Merit, 1969
 Allied Artists of America, Honorable Mention in Oil, 1976
 Allied Artists of America, Grumbacher Gold Medal, 1980
 Allied Artist of America, Gold Medal of Honor
 Audubon Artist of America, Creative Oil Award, 1969
 Audubon Artist of America, Distinguished Contributions Award, 1980
 Audubon Artists of America, Binney-Smith Award, 1982
 Audubon Artists of America, Certificate of Merit, 1983
 Berkshire Art Association, Wm. A. Burns Prize, 1967
 Silvermine Guild of Artists, Silvermine Tavern Award, 1966
 Hudson Valley Art Association, Cornelia Cummings Award, 1976
 Painter and Sculptors' Society of New Jersey, 1964
 American Veterans' Society of Artists, B.F. Marrow Prize, 1961
 Washington Square Outdoor Show, New York City, Twentieth Century Film Corp. Uric Bell Award, 1st Prize, 1967
 Washington Square Outdoor Show, New York City, Salmagundi Award, 1968
 Washington Square Outdoor Show, New York City, 1st Prize for Oil, 1964
 National Academy of Design, Salters Gold Medal, 1984
 Audubon Artists of America, Liquitex Award, 1984

References

1925 births
20th-century American painters
1984 deaths
People from Burlington, Iowa
People from Monmouth, Illinois
United States Navy personnel of World War II
University of Iowa alumni
Deaths from cancer in Iowa
Deaths from oral cancer